The 1993 Team Ice Racing World Championship was the 15th edition of the Team World Championship. The final was held on 6/7 March, 1993, in Assen, in the Netherlands. Russia won the title.

Final classification

Semi-final 
Berlin - 6/7 Feb

Semi-final 
Gallio, Veneto - 6/7 Feb

See also 
 1993 Individual Ice Speedway World Championship
 1993 Speedway World Team Cup in classic speedway
 1993 Individual Speedway World Championship in classic speedway

References 

Ice speedway competitions
World